Spathocera dalmanii, known as Dalman's leatherbug, is a species of insect in the family Coreidae, tribe Coreini. It is native to Europe.

Description
Spathocera dalmanii is brown with a long, pale-sided pronotum. There are no spines on the antennae, head, or pronotum. The scutellum has two wedge-shaped black markings.

Ecology and behavior
This bug feeds on sheep's sorrel, Rumex acetosella. The adults move slowly and rarely fly.

There may be two generations per year in warmer areas.

References

Coreini
Hemiptera of Europe